Bernard Anthony Hebda (born September 3, 1959) is an American prelate of the Roman Catholic Church who has served as the twelfth archbishop of the Archdiocese of Saint Paul and Minneapolis in Minnesota since March 24, 2016.

Prior to his installation as the archbishop, Hebda had served as both the apostolic administrator of that archdiocese since June 2015, as well as the coadjutor archbishop of the Archdiocese of Newark in New Jersey since September 2013. Before that, he was bishop of the Diocese of Gaylord in Michigan from 2009-2013, as well as in the Roman Curia on the Pontifical Council for Legislative Texts.

Besides English, Hebda speaks Italian and knows Latin, French, and Spanish.

Biography

Early life 
Bernard Hebda was born in Pittsburgh, Pennsylvania, on September 3, 1959, in the community of Brookline. He attended South Hills Catholic High School and then entered Harvard University, where he earned a Bachelor of Political Science degree in 1980. He received a JD from Columbia Law School at the Parker School of Foreign and Comparative Law  in New York City in 1983.

Hebda studied philosophy at the Saint Paul Seminary in Pittsburgh from 1984 to 1985. He lived at the Pontifical North American College in Rome and attended the Pontifical Gregorian University, where he earned a Bachelor of Sacred Theology degree (1985–1988) and a licentiate in Canon Law (1988–1990).

Priesthood 
On July 1, 1989, Hebda was ordained by Bishop Donald Wuerl as a priest for the Diocese of Pittsburgh.  He then held the following positions: 

 Assistant priest at the Purification of the Blessed Virgin Mary Parish in Ellwood City, Pennsylvania (1989) 
 Personal secretary to Bishop Wuerl and master of ceremonies (1990–1992) 
 Pastor in solidum at the Prince of Peace Parish in Pittsburgh (South Side) (1992–1995)
 Judge of the Diocesan Tribunal (1992–1996) 
 Director of the Newman Center at Slippery Rock University in Slippery Rock, Pennsylvania (1995–1996)

Hebda worked in Rome at the Pontifical Council for Legislative Texts beginning on September 10, 1996. On February 16, 2000, he was named a monsignor by the Vatican. From 2003, he served as under-secretary of the Pontifical Council.

In Rome, Hebda was also an adjunct spiritual director at the Pontifical North American College and confessor to the Missionaries of Charity. He lived at the Villa Stritch, a residence for American priests working for the Holy See. On October 16, 2009, following the announcement of his appointment as a bishop, the community at the Pontifical North American College presented him with a pectoral cross and crosier.

Bishop of Gaylord 
On October 7, 2009, Pope Benedict XVI named Hebda the fourth bishop of the Diocese of Gaylord. Hebda was consecrated and installed on December 1, 2009, at Saint Mary, Our Lady of Mount Carmel Cathedral in Gaylord, Michigan. In November 2013, Hebda was elected to chair the Committee on Canonical Affairs and Church Governance of the United States Conference of Catholic Bishops (USCCB).

Coadjutor Archbishop of Newark 
Hebda was appointed as coadjutor archbishop of the Archdiocese of Newark on September 24, 2013. Archbishop John Myers had asked for the appointment of a coadjutor to assist him as he approached retirement age. Hebda chose a dormitory at Seton Hall University in South Orange, New Jersey, as his residence. He defended Myers against complaints he had spent an extravagant amount on living quarters for his retirement, noting that Myers had lived in shared quarters at the cathedral rectory in Newark for thirteen years.

Apostolic administrator of Saint Paul and Minneapolis 

On June 15, 2015, Pope Francis accepted the resignations of Archbishop John Nienstedt and Auxiliary Bishop Lee A. Piché of the Archdiocese of Saint Paul and Minneapolis due to poor health. The same day, Francis appointed Hebda as its apostolic administrator to serve until a new archbishop would be installed, although Hebda remained as the Coadjutor Archbishop of Newark.

In September 2015, Hebda met with representatives of the Minnesota chapter of the Catholic Coalition for Church Reform, a group his predecessor had not been warm to. They discussed how the laity could participate in defining the needs of the archdiocese and what it expects from its next archbishop. Hebda "was delighted to learn that they share my interest in engaging in a wide consultation of the faithful in assessing the needs of the archdiocese" and "I was also happy to share with them some of the preliminary plans for that consultation, and appreciated their input and offer of collaboration." He organized a series of public meetings – "listening sessions" – throughout the diocese to allow Catholic parishioners, clergy, and employees to express their views on the appointment of a new archbishop.

During Hebda's term as administrator, the Archdiocese of Saint Paul and Minneapolis reached agreement on a civil settlement with officials of Ramsey County on procedures to prevent child sexual abuse. It provided for judicial oversight for three years. The civil case was settled in December under a plan that allowed for more oversight of the church. Attorneys for both sides used the hearing process in the civil case to announce new steps aimed at reinforcing that agreement. "The Archdiocese admits that it failed to adequately respond and prevent the sexual abuse" of the three victims, the archdiocese said in papers filed in Ramsey County Court. "The Archdiocese failed to keep the safety and wellbeing of these three children ahead of protecting the interests of Curtis Wehmeyer and the Archdiocese. The actions and omissions of the Archdiocese failed to prevent the abuse that resulted in the need for protection and services for these three children." In a letter to Catholics in the archdiocese, Hebda wrote: "We are agreeing to implement the plan under a set deadline and to be held accountable for that commitment." He called the settlement "the most public indicator that this archdiocese has earnestly embarked on a journey of self-reflection, evaluation and action". In his time as administrator, less than a year, he handled a number of cases of priests accused of sexual abuse of minors, both removing and reinstating them.

Archbishop of Saint Paul and Minneapolis 
On March 24, 2016, Hebda was named archbishop of Saint Paul and Minneapolis, at which point his appointment as coadjutor archbishop of Newark ended. He was installed in the Cathedral of Saint Paul in St. Paul, Minnesota, on May 13, 2016.

A major defining aspect of Hebda's tenure in the Archdiocese of Saint Paul and Minneapolis was the continuing legal processes surrounding the fallout of the sexual abuse crisis in the archdiocese.  Before his arrival, in January of 2015, the archdiocese had filed for Chapter 11 bankruptcy. In September of 2018, the archdiocese's bankruptcy-exit plan was approved by a federal judge; by the end of the year, the archbishop announced that it was officially out of bankruptcy. 

In the summer of 2019, Hebda announced that he would be calling an archdiocesan synod. This would be the first synod held in the archdiocese in eight decades; in his initial announcement on June 7, Hebda said that, "In the time that [he has] served in this archdiocese, [he has] come to believe that [the] local Church is particularly ripe for a synod". In a mass the following Saturday evening for the Solemn Vigil of Pentecost, Hebda formally announced that a synod would take place; two years later, at a mass commemorating the same holy day, the synod was officially convoked. It culminated in June of 2022 with an archdiocesan synodal assembly. Hebda released a pastoral letter, "You Shall Be My Witnesses," on the Feast of Christ the King, 2022.

See also

 Catholic Church hierarchy
 Catholic Church in the United States
 Historical list of the Catholic bishops of the United States
 List of Catholic bishops of the United States
 Lists of patriarchs, archbishops, and bishops

References

External links
Roman Catholic Archdiocese of Saint Paul and Minneapolis Official Site
 Archbishop Bernard Anthony Hebda at Catholic-Hierarchy.com 

 

 

 

1959 births
Living people
Harvard University alumni
Columbia Law School alumni
Pontifical Gregorian University alumni
Pontifical North American College alumni
Roman Catholic bishops of Gaylord
Roman Catholic Archdiocese of Newark
Religious leaders from Pittsburgh
21st-century Roman Catholic archbishops in the United States